Mitra Sen Ahir was an 18th century Ahir ruler of Rewari. He fought against many enemies, including Muslim, Marathas, British invaders and Kachhava rulers of Jaipur.

To retaliate, the Jaipur rulers attacked Rewari in the early months of 1781; they were defeated by Rao Mitter Sen and in the conflict suffered heavy losses. In 1785, a Maratha expedition to Rewari was repelled by Rao of Rewari. Shortly afterwards he died. The Marathas tried to invade again, but again suffered heavy loss by Rao Raja Ram Singh of Rewari.

Battle of Mandan
In 1784, The Battle of Mandan was fought between the Shekhawat chiefs and the Mughal Empire who were helped by Ahirs of Rewari under Mitra sen Ahir. Ahirs came out victorious in the battle.

Legacy
Every year in the months of May-June, there was Mela organised at Border near Lisan-Gokulgarh villages in the memory of Rao Mitter sen . Khichdi is made and women were singing bhajan in local dialect i.e. Ahirwati

See also
 Yaduvanshi Ahirs
 Rewari
 Haryana

References

History of Jaipur
Ahir history